The 2020 Medan mayoral election was held on 9 December 2020, as part of the 2020 simultaneous local elections in Indonesia. The mayoral election was contested between sitting acting mayor Akhyar Nasution and Bobby Nasution, son-in-law of President Joko Widodo.

Candidates
Two sets of candidates are running for the election. The previously elected mayor, Dzulmi Eldin, had been arrested on graft charges in October 2019.
 Bobby Nasution (PDI-P), property businessman and son-in-law of president Joko Widodo, with city councillor Aulia Rachman (Gerindra) as running mate,
 Akhyar Nasution (Demokrat), acting mayor of Medan and formerly elected as deputy mayor, with provincial legislator Salman Alfarisi (PKS) as running mate.

Akhyar was formerly a member of PDI-P, but left the party due to PDI-P's decision to nominate Bobby for the mayoral race. Outside of PDI-P and Gerindra, Bobby was also endorsed by PAN, Golkar, Nasdem, PSI, Hanura and PPP, while Akhyar was supported by just Demokrat and PKS.

Campaign
Two rounds of public debates between the candidates were held on 7 and 21 November 2020.

References

Medan
Medan
Mayoral elections in Indonesia
December 2020 events in Indonesia